Lidstone is a surname. Notable people with the surname include:
Dorothy Lidstone (born 1938), Canadian archer
George James Lidstone (1870–1952), British actuary